is a Japanese ski jumper. He is the older brother of Yūka Kobayashi, Ryōyū Kobayashi and Tatsunao Kobayashi who are also ski jumpers.

Career
He represented Japan at the FIS Nordic World Ski Championships 2015 in Falun, where he finished 13th place on large hill and 25th place on normal hill.

He won three times in Grand Prix competition in Almaty and Hakuba. He finished in 3rd place overall in the 2017 FIS Ski Jumping Grand Prix season.

On 19 November 2017, he claimed his first World Cup win in Wisła and became the thirteenth Japanese ski jumper with at least one World Cup win.

Major Tournament results

Olympics

FIS World Nordic Ski Championships

Ski Flying World Championships

World Cup results

Standings

Individual wins

Individual starts (172)

References

External links

1991 births
Living people
People from Iwate Prefecture
Japanese male ski jumpers
Universiade medalists in ski jumping
Olympic ski jumpers of Japan
Ski jumpers at the 2018 Winter Olympics
Ski jumpers at the 2022 Winter Olympics
FIS Nordic World Ski Championships medalists in ski jumping
Universiade gold medalists for Japan
Universiade silver medalists for Japan
Competitors at the 2013 Winter Universiade
Competitors at the 2015 Winter Universiade